is a Japanese manga series written and illustrated by Mokumokuren. It began serialization on Kadokawa Shoten's Young Ace Up website in August 2021. As of October 2022, the series' individual chapters have been collected into two tankōbon volumes. Mokumokuren first conceived of the series while studying for exams and later began posting drawings on Twitter, which led to the Young Ace Up editorial department approaching Mokumokuren to serialize the manga via the Young Ace Up website.

Upon release of the first volume, the series became a critical and commercial success, with the first volume selling 200,000 copies in three months, and received critical praise for story, artwork, and characters.

Plot
Yoshiki and Hikaru are two teenage boys living in a small town in rural Japan. Despite having opposite personalities and different hobbies, the two maintain a close friendship with both harboring potential romantic feelings for each other. However, on one summer day, Hikaru is fatally injured while hiking in the mountains alone. Before dying, a mysterious eldritch being comes across him and consumes him, becoming him physically in the process. This "Hikaru" has all the feelings and memories of the original, yet remains a separate being, something Yoshiki realizes rather quickly. Yoshiki still wants to stay with "Hikaru", however "Hikaru"'s alien nature, along with other eldritch beings and hunters of said beings may make that impossible.

Characters

Production
Mokumokuren first conceived the series while studying for high school entrance exams. After graduating, Mokumokuren began posting drawings on Twitter in their spare time in January 2021. Mokumokuren was later approached by the Young Ace Up editorial department to serialize the manga in Young Ace Up, which they accepted. Mokumokuren is a fan of action manga from Weekly Shōnen Jump and Weekly Young Jump, particularly Tokyo Ghoul.

While writing the story, Mokumokuren tries to keep the horror to a minimum by trying to appeal to people's emotions rather than just being scary. Mokumokuren also feels the theme of the story adds to the horror based on the suspension bridge effect, which states that it is easier to fall in love when feeling anxious or fearful. For the artwork, Mokumokuren tries to use onomatopoeia that are not often used, while also staying cautious to make sure it works properly in the context of the story.

Publication
Written and illustrated by Mokumokuren, the series began serialization on Kadokawa Shoten's Young Ace Up website on August 31, 2021. As of October 2022, the series' individual chapters have been collected into two tankōbon volumes.

In September 2022, Yen Press announced that they licensed the series for English publication.

Volume list

Reception
In the 2022 Next Manga Award, The Summer Hikaru Died ranked 11th in the web manga category. It was also the most popular choice among traditional Chinese voters. The series topped the 2023 edition of Takarajimasha's Kono Manga ga Sugoi! list of best manga for male readers. It was also nominated for the 16th Manga Taishō. The series ranked fifth in the Nationwide Bookstore Employees' Recommended Comics of 2023. The first volume received three times more orders than copies available in the first print run. The volume was reprinted six times in three months, having over 200,000 copies in circulation.

Chanmei from Real Sound praised the story and characters as emotional. Chanmei also praised the artwork, believing it complemented the story well. Tensako Miura from An An praised the story, main characters, and artwork, positively noting the artwork's use of shades of black.

References

External links
  
 

Horror anime and manga
Japanese webcomics
Kadokawa Shoten manga
School life in anime and manga
Slice of life anime and manga
Seinen manga
Webcomics in print
Yen Press titles